The 2012–13 GMHL season was the seventh season of the Greater Metro Junior A Hockey League (GMHL). The fifteen teams of the GMHL played 42-game schedules.

Starting in February 2013, the top teams of the league played down for the Russell Cup, emblematic of the grand championship of the GMHL.  Since the GMHL is independent from Hockey Canada and the Canadian Junior Hockey League, this is where the GMHL's season ended.

The Bradford Rattlers won their third regular season title with a perfect record of 42 wins and no losses.  With a 14 win, 2 loss record, the Rattlers also won their third Russell Cup as league playoff champions with a 4-games-to-2 victory over the Temiscaming Titans.

Changes 
Expansion granted to the Rama Aces.
Powassan Eagles announce return.
Expansion granted to the Bradford Bulls.
Expansion granted to the Toronto Attack.
Expansion granted to the Bracebridge Phantoms.
Elliot Lake Bobcats leave league for Northern Ontario Junior Hockey League.
Deseronto Storm leave league for Empire B Junior C Hockey League.
Algoma Avalanche cease operations.

Final standings
Note: GP = Games played; W = Wins; L = Losses; OTL = Overtime losses; SL = Shootout losses; GF = Goals for; GA = Goals against; PTS = Points; x = clinched playoff berth; y = clinched division title; z = clinched conference title

Teams listed on the official league website.

Standings listed on official league website.

2012-13 Russell Cup Playoffs

Playoff results are listed on the official league website.

Scoring leaders 
Note: GP = Games played; G = Goals; A = Assists; Pts = Points; PIM = Penalty minutes

Leading goaltenders 
Note: GP = Games played; Mins = Minutes played; W = Wins; L = Losses: OTL = Overtime losses; SL = Shootout losses; GA = Goals Allowed; SO = Shutouts; GAA = Goals against average

Awards
Top Scorer: Illes Gallo (Rattlers)
Most Valuable Player: Andreas Norrby (Rattlers)
Rookie of the Year: Devon Gillham (Bulls)
Top Forward: Illes Gallo (Rattlers)
Top Defenceman: Andreas Norrby (Rattlers)
Top Goaltender: Anton Todykov (Red Wings)
Top Defensive Forward: Aaron Scott (Rattlers)
Most Sportsmanlike Player: Glen Patterson (Bucks)
Most Heart: Ricky Darrell (Aces)
Top Coach: Johan Lundskog (Rattlers)

See also 
 2012 in ice hockey
 2013 in ice hockey

References

External links 
 Official website of the Greater Metro Junior A Hockey League

GMHL
Greater Metro Junior A Hockey League seasons